Murder, Inc. is a 1960 American gangster film starring Stuart Whitman, May Britt, Henry Morgan, Peter Falk, and Simon Oakland. The Cinemascope film was directed by Burt Balaban and Stuart Rosenberg. The screenplay was based on the true story of Murder, Inc., a Brooklyn gang that operated in the 1930s.

Falk plays Abe Reles, a vicious thug who led the Murder, Inc. gang and was believed to have committed 30 murders, for which he was never prosecuted. The film was the first major feature role for Falk, who was nominated for a Best Supporting Actor Oscar for his performance. In his 2006 autobiography Just One More Thing, Falk said that Murder, Inc. launched his career.

This was the first film directed by Rosenberg, who later won acclaim for Cool Hand Luke (1967), and it launched Stuart Whitman's career as a leading man.

A highly fictionalized film on the same basic events titled The Enforcer (1951), starring Humphrey Bogart, was released in the United Kingdom with the title Murder, Inc.

Plot summary
Abe Reles (Peter Falk) and Bug Workman (Warren Finnerty), two killers from Brooklyn's Brownsville district, meet in the Garment District to meet with Louis "Lepke" Buchalter, kingpin of an organized crime mob, who hires them as the syndicate's hit men.

Their first job is to kill Walter Sage (Morey Amsterdam), a resort owner who has been holding back slot machine profits from Lepke. To get close to Sage, Reles forces singer Joey Collins (Stuart Whitman), an old crony of Sage who owes Reles money, to help him. Reles and his henchman kill Sage. Reles visits Joey and threatens to kill him and his dancer wife Eadie (May Britt) if they tell anyone about the murder. Eadie throws Reles out. Reles later returns to the apartment when Joey is gone and brutally rapes her. Despite her urging, Joey refuses to run away, and this causes him and Eadie to split.

Reles continues to make assassinations at Lepke's direction. Reles reconciles with the couple by giving them a luxurious apartment filled with stolen goods. Under police pressure, Lepke hides from the police at Joey and Eadie's new apartment. He treats Eadie like a maid.

District Attorney Burton Turkus (Henry Morgan) takes over the law enforcement campaign against Murder, Inc., enlisting local Brownsville police detective Tobin (Simon Oakland). Lepke orders the death of the entire Brownsville gang as well as Joey and Eadie. Eadie visits Turkus and becomes an informant as does Joey. He then confronts Reles, who has been arrested, in his cell, and threatens to testify against him. In fear of this testimony, Reles agrees to testify against Lepke in exchange for reduced charges. He provides a detailed account of the activities of Murder, Inc.

Turkus puts Joey and Reles in protective custody and hides them at the Half Moon Hotel in Coney Island. Eadie comes to visit Joey, imploring him to testify against Lepke. Joey is reluctant, fearing the mob will kill Eadie in revenge. Despondent, Eadie slips her police escort and wanders alone on the beachfront, where she is murdered. Later that night, Reles is thrown out the window by an assassin. Joey avenges his wife's death by testifying against Lepke, who is executed.

Cast

 Stuart Whitman as Joey Collins
 May Britt as Eadie Collins
 Henry Morgan as Burton Turkus
 Peter Falk as Abe 'Kid Twist' Reles
 David J. Stewart as Louis 'Lepke' Buchalter
 Simon Oakland as Lt. Detective William Flaherty Tobin
 Sarah Vaughan as nightclub singer
 Morey Amsterdam as Walter Sage
 Eli Mintz as Joe Rosen
 Joseph Bernard as Mendy Weiss
 Warren Finnerty as Bug Workman
 Vincent Gardenia as Lazlo
 Helen Waters as Mrs. Rose Corsi
 Leon B. Stevens as Loughran
 Howard Smith as Albert Anastasia (credited as Howard I. Smith)

The film was the screen debut of Sylvia Miles and Sarah Vaughan.  Seymour Cassel appears as an unbilled extra.

Original book
Twentieth Century-Fox based Murder, Inc. on a 1951 book of the same title by Burton Turkus, former district attorney of New York, and Sid Feder.

It is similar in style to the popular TV series The Untouchables, which may have inspired the studio to make the movie.

The story of the Murder, Inc. crime group was first told on the screen in the Warner Brothers film The Enforcer, a semi-fictional film that was released as Murder, Inc. overseas. The film starred Humphrey Bogart, in his last role for the studio, as a crusading district attorney in the mold of Turkus. A Lepke-type character was played by Everett Sloane. Ted De Corsia played a character loosely based on Reles.

The films differ in that Murder, Inc. is factual and dealt with a Mafia kingpin's establishment of a contract murder organization within that framework, and The Enforcer is fictional and had a freelance group willing to work for anyone in or out of the mob. The 1951 film begins with De Corsia's falling off a ledge despite Bogart's attempt to save him, and includes gruesome scenes based on fact.

Production
The novel was optioned by Burt Balaban's Princess Pictures. Balaban was the son of Paramount executive Barney Balaban. It was made in associated with Robert L. Lippert's Associate Productions and 20th Century Fox.

Casting
Murder, Inc. was filmed in and around New York City, and the cast consisted largely of actors from the off-Broadway theater. Peter Falk recalled in his autobiography Just One More Thing that the film was "no big deal for Twentieth Century Fox. They hired second-tier stars, nobody had ever heard of them. The cast of off-Broadway stage actors, including me, came cheap. A few dollars a week and a bag of peanuts."

Stuart Rosenberg, who had been directing for Alfred Hitchcock Presents, was signed to make his feature debut as director.

Robert Evans, who later became head of production at Paramount Pictures Corporation but at the time was a young actor, was offered the part of Reles and turned it down. In an interview with The Guardian in 2002, Evans said:

I was hot as an actor for a few minutes and I turned down parts that got guys nominated for Academy Awards. For example, there was a picture called Murder, Inc. which was to star Stuart Whitman, May Britt and myself. I said "If I'm not going to lead, then I'm not going to play the part." and got a suspension. And they hired an actor who had never been north of 14th Street in New York and had never been to Hollywood – this guy called Peter Falk. And he was nominated for the part that I went on suspension for.

Falk had appeared in Kraft Mystery Theatre. He showed his performance to Balaban who decided to cast him.

Falk said that "for me, Murder, Inc. was more than a big deal – it was a miracle. Like being touched from above. Of all the thousands of obscure actors, they picked me." Were it not for being cast in the film, he said he would not have been cast in his subsequent films A Pocketful of Miracles (1961) and Robin and the Seven Hoods (1964). He said Murder, Inc. "made my career". Had he not been selected to portray Reles, he said, he still would be in the off-Broadway theater.

Shooting
Filming started 15 February 1960. It took place at Filmways Studio and location at Manhattan and Brooklyn.

Falk chose his wardrobe for the film from second-hand clothing stores, going from store to store until he got the right coat and hat, to give him the "East Coast 'wise guy' look". He patterned his performance as Reles on would-be gangsters whom he knew in his youth at a pool hall named McGuire's. "I had a real feel for these guys – the way they talked – the gestures – the whole package." Falk said that he rewrote the part and that Rosenberg gave him the latitude to depart from the script.

According to Falk, production of the movie was accelerated because of an impending actor's strike. Rosenberg was fired and replaced by Balaban, who had no experience as a director. Falk said that Balaban "stayed out of the way" while the crew and cast did their jobs. In Bullets Over Hollywood, a 2005 study of gangster movies, film scholar John McCarty stated that the "presence of two helmsmen may explain the uneven qualities of the film", in which scenes of powerful impact are "offset by long expanses of unexciting celluloid".

Filming was to have taken 20 days, but because of the strike, it was decided to film it in nine days by extending the shooting days from 9 am to 11 pm, working on weekends, and rearranging the schedule. On 27 February 1960, Balaban took over as director from Rosenberg, and Gayne Rescher replaced Joseph Brun as cinematographer.

Production of the movie took place up to the very last moments before the actor's strike. The last scene to be shot was the murder of Walter Sage, portrayed by Morey Amsterdam. Because of the shortage of time, the scene, set in the Catskill Mountains, was shot outside the studio on 126th Street in Harlem. The Sage execution was filmed minutes before the start of the strike at midnight.

Reception

Critical response 
New York Times film critic Bosley Crowther dismissed the film as a "new screen telling of an old story". Crowther singled out Falk's "amusingly vicious performance", and that when he appears "there is a certain dark frightfulness and terror" in the film. But "otherwise the traffic is that of an average gangster film that slacks off too much for proper tension and runs a great deal too long." Crowther praised the other leading performances but said that Morgan, a radio and TV personality known mainly for his sharp wit, "does better when he is telling jokes".

Describing Falk's performance, Crowther wrote:

Mr. Falk, moving as if weary, looking at people out of the corners of his eyes and talking as if he had borrowed Marlon Brando's chewing gum, seems a travesty of a killer, until the water suddenly freezes in his eyes and he whips an icepick from his pocket and starts punching holes in someone's ribs. Then viciousness pours out of him and you get a sense of a felon who is hopelessly cracked and corrupt."

More recent reviewers have praised Falk's performance, but have not lavished much praise on the movie, with commentators divided on the film's semi-documentary style. A 1986 study of films as art praised the film's "journalistic thoroughness" and "teledramatic immediacy". Falk's performance, it stated, "is one of the grittiest portrayals of the primitivism of an underworld henchman on film; the supporting relationships of Whitman's cowardly, acquiescent innocent and May Britt's beleaguered wife perversely juxtaposed to the unusual pathos generated by the crime boss and his aide delineate the glumness of the crime world with few concessions to moral righteousness".

In the 1997 book Crime Movies, film historian Carlos Clarens compared Murder, Inc. unfavorably to Samuel Fuller's Underworld USA (1961), released at about the same time, on the grounds that it stuck too closely to the facts. Falk, he wrote, delivered a "miscalculated comic performance" as Reles, and "the power and resonance of The Enforcer was missing, chiefly because the facts tyrannized the weak screenplay". In contrast, the book states Underworld USA was a "free and colorful fiction" that "packed the visual and dramatic wallop of an atrocity photo in the National Enquirer".

DVD Review called Murder, Inc. "an entertaining, if somewhat trifling, piece of violent fluff". It wrote that "Peter Falk walks away with the movie anyway. Falk was nominated for a Best Supporting Actor Academy Award for this film, and it is easy to see why. He imbues his role with the sleazy charisma and rugged charm that would later become his trademark on the long-running 'Columbo.'" Another reviewer wrote in 2001 that "the best thing about the film was Falk's tough-guy performance. Otherwise, everything was routine."

In 2005, film scholar John McCarty praised Falk's performance and David J. Stewart's "reptilian" Lepke, and wrote "the film belongs to Stewart and Falk; as with Daniel Day-Lewis in Gangs of New York, it is mostly when they are on the screen that this minor but engaging docudrama about the mob's ugly but profitable murder-for-hire business really cooks."

The stylistic score by Frank De Vol was well received. It is included in the soundtrack album of the film, released by Canadian-American Records in the same year as the film release.

Accolades 
Falk was nominated for the Academy Award for Best Supporting Actor for his performance as Reles. It was the film's only Academy Award nomination.

Falk unsuccessfully campaigned for the award. In a 1997 interview with writer Arthur Marx, Falk said that the idea of campaigning for the award was suggested by Sal Mineo, but that he did not take the idea seriously until it was suggested by Abe Lastfogel, head of the William Morris Agency. He hired a press agent "and what do you know – I got nominated." Falk described what happened at the award ceremonies as follows:

"Now we're in our seats; the press agent, Judd Bernard, is seated on my right. It's my category and I heard a voice say 'And the winner is Peter...I'm rising out of my seat... Ustinov.' I'm heading back down. When I hit the seat, I turn to the press agent: 'You're fired.' I didn't want him charging me for another day."

See also 
 List of American films of 1960

References

External links
 
 
 
 

1960 films
1960 crime drama films
20th Century Fox films
American crime drama films
American black-and-white films
1960s English-language films
Films scored by Frank De Vol
Films about capital punishment
Films about Italian-American organized crime
Films about Jewish-American organized crime
Films directed by Stuart Rosenberg
Films set in New York City
Films set in Brooklyn
Films set in the 1930s
Films shot in New York City
American police detective films
Murder, Inc.
Cultural depictions of Louis Buchalter
Cultural depictions of Albert Anastasia
American gangster films
1960 directorial debut films
Films directed by Burt Balaban
1960s American films